James Joseph Patrick (J. J. P.) Corrigan was a Republican lawyer from Ohio. He was in private practice for thirty years and a judge for twenty years, including 1969–1976 as an associate justice of the Ohio Supreme Court. He also landed on Normandy Beach on June 6, 1944.

Biography
Corrigan was born in Cleveland, Ohio on July 27, 1901 to Irish immigrants, Patrick and Nora Walsh Corrigan. He received a bachelor's degree in 1922 from John Carroll University. He moved to Washington, D.C. and received a master's degree in law and juris doctor from Georgetown University Law School in 1925 and was admitted to the Washington, D.C. bar.

Corrigan returned to Cleveland in 1926, passed the Ohio bar, and had a private practice as a trial and appeals lawyer from 1926 to 1956. He was chief assistant police prosecutor of Cleveland under mayor Harry L. Davis from 1933 to 1937. In 1942 he was drafted into the United States Army as a private. He landed on Normandy beach on June 6, 1944, and fought in campaigns in northern France, Ardennes, Rhineland and central Europe. He received battlefield promotion to second lieutenant, and was awarded five battle stars and a Bronze Star Medal. He was honorably discharged October, 1945.

In 1956, Corrigan was elected a judge of the Cuyahoga County Court of Common Pleas, serving from 1957 to 1963. In 1962, he was elected to the 8th District Court of Appeals for Ohio for a six-year term, and re-elected in 1968. He taught trial practice at Cleveland–Marshall College of Law from 1963 to 1969.

In June 1969, Ohio Supreme Court Associate Justice Charles B. Zimmerman died. Governor Jim Rhodes appointed Corrigan to fill the unexpired term on September 11, 1969. He was elected to a six-year term in 1970, but was barred by age restriction from running for another term in 1976.

After retirement from the bench, Corrigan was a partner in the Cleveland firm Marshman, Snyder and Corrigan from 1978 until his death on May 16, 1982. Corrigan married Nancy McGuiness on February 26, 1948. He is buried in Lakewood Park Cemetery.

References

External links

1901 births
1982 deaths
Burials at Lakewood Park Cemetery
Ohio Republicans
Justices of the Ohio Supreme Court
Lawyers from Cleveland
Judges of the Ohio District Courts of Appeals
Georgetown University Law Center alumni
John Carroll University alumni
United States Army personnel of World War II
United States Army officers
Cleveland State University faculty
20th-century American judges
20th-century American lawyers